Lloyd Fernando (31 May 1926 – 28 February 2008) was a Malaysian author and professor at the University of Malaya in the English Department.

Life
Lloyd Fernando was born to a Sinhalese family in Sri Lanka in 1926.  In 1938, his family migrated to Singapore.  Mr. Fernando was educated at St Patrick’s in Singapore, with the Japanese occupation interrupting that education from 1943 to 1945.  During the Japanese attack on Singapore, Mr. Fernando’s father was killed. During the Japanese occupation, Fernando worked in a variety of manual labour jobs.

Lloyd Fernando thereafter graduated from the University of Malaya in Singapore, and subsequently served as an instructor at the Singapore Polytechnic.  Lloyd Fernando became an assistant lecturer at the University of Malaya in Kuala Lumpur in 1960.  Mr. Fernando was awarded a scholarship at Leeds University, UK where he received his PhD.

In 1967 Fernando was appointed to serve as a professor at the English Department of the University of Malaya, where he served until his retirement in 1978.  Subsequently, Mr. Fernando studied law at City University in the United Kingdom and then at Middle Temple, returning to Malaysia with two law degrees, whereupon he was employed by a law firm, and thereafter started a separate law practice business.  In 1997, Mr. Fernando had a stroke and ceased his professional activities.

One of his most successful novels is Green is the Colour (1993). It has been described as “a sensitive novel about racial and religious tolerance set against the shadow of the 1969 racial riot in Kuala Lumpur [also known as the 13 May incident] where four main characters, good young people from different ethnic groups, become  friends and even fall in love.” It has also been claimed that the use of Malaysian English in the novel serves as a political tool to indicate that different religious and ethnic groups in Malaysia may find a common language and a shared culture.

Literary works
 Scorpion Orchid, 1976, 
 Cultures in Conflict, 1986, 
 Green is the Colour, 1993, 
 Twenty-two Malaysian Stories: an anthology of writing in English (editor), 1968
 Malaysian Short Stories (editor), 1981
 "New Women" in the Late Victorian Novel, 1977,

References

External links
  “Lloyd Fernando’s Circle: An Interview withMarie Fernando, Wife of Lloyd Fernando”
  Green is the Color
  Lloyd Fernando: A Tribute, by Professor Mohammad A. Quayum
 "Self-Refashioning a Plural Society: Dialogism and Syncretism in Malaysian Postcolonial Literature," by Professor Mohammad A. Quayum
 "Unity lost? Reframing Ethnic Relations in Lloyd Fernando's Green is the Colour" by David C.L. Lim
 "Multiracial Clans in Colorful Malaya" by Christopher B. Patterson
 "The ruins of referentiality: Allegorical realism and traumatic fragments in Scorpion Orchid and The Search" by Augustine Chay

 Bernard Wilson, Do You Wish to Join this Society or Not?: The Paradox of Nationhood in Lloyd Fernando's Scorpion Orchid, Kunapipi, Volume XXII, No. 1 2000, Dangaroo Press, U.K., pp. 11-16
 Bernard Wilson, "The Legacy of Colonialism: Issues of Identity in Lloyd Fernando's Green is the Colour" in A View of Our Own: Ethnocentric Perspectives in Literature, Fakulti Pengajian Bahasa, UKM, 1996, Kuala Lumpur, Malaysia, pp. 290-297.

1926 births
2008 deaths
Malaysian writers
Alumni of the University of Leeds
Malaysian people of Sri Lankan descent
English-language writers from Malaysia
Sri Lankan emigrants to Malaysia
Sinhalese writers